Independent Republican was a political title frequently used by Irish republicans when contesting elections in the Republic of Ireland and Northern Ireland since the 1920s.

In the main, but certainly not always, Independent Republican candidates were members of Sinn Féin or the Irish Republican Army. In times when these organizations were proscribed or when they refused to register as political parties, the label "Independent Republican" was used.

History
The 1916 Rising
The Anglo-Irish Treaty
The Troubles

The Republic of Ireland
 John Carroll, local politician from Offaly, ex Sinn Féin
 Fr. Patrick Ryan - Munster European Election 1989

Northern Ireland 
Gerry McGeough
Frank Maguire - Fermanagh South Tyrone
Bobby Sands - Fermanagh South Tyrone
Anthony Mulvey - Mid Ulster
Tom Mitchell -Mid Ulster 
Bernadette Devlin - Mid Ulster

Irish Republican Army
Sinn Féin